Madhavi Venkatesan is an American economist and environmental activist. She is an associate teaching professor of economics at Northeastern University.

Biography
Venkatesan received her BA, MA, and PhD in Economics from Vanderbilt University. She then held senior level positions in investor relations for three Fortune 250 companies in the insurance sector. In 2014, she re-entered academic employment as an assistant professor of Economics at Bridgewater State University and in 2017, she joined the faculty of the Department of Economics at Northeastern University as an assistant teaching professor.

Venkatesan traveled to the Philippines in 2018 as the Fulbright-SyCip Distinguished Lecturer. In 2019 she published her fourth text, SDG8 - Sustainable Economic Growth and Decent Work for All.

As of April 2021, Venkatesan serves as the editor in chief of Sustainability and Climate Change.

Research
Venkatesan's academic interests include the integration of sustainability into the economics curriculum.  She has been active in promoting education and stakeholder engagement to incorporate ethics into the existing economic framework
and her written work has largely focused on these topics as a catalyst to promoting sustainability. Venkatesan has also contributed to the literature on the relationship between culture, sustainability and economics, addressing the relationship between economic systems and cultural convergence.  She is an advocate for changing the quantitative focus of present economic goals (e.g., GDP, income) to qualitative attributes of well-being that acknowledge and incorporate the interconnectivity, known and unknown, in human decision-making.

Sustainable Practices

In 2016, Venkatesan established Sustainable Practices,  a 501(c)3 nonprofit with a mission "to facilitate a culture of sustainability as defined by reducing the human-made impact to the planet and its ecosystems" within Barnstable County, Massachusetts, and serves as the organization's executive director. In 2019, Sustainable Practices initiated the Municipal Plastic Bottle Ban campaign. The organization followed with the Commercial Single-use Plastic Water Bottle Ban in 2020. In 2023, Sustainable Practices initiated an additional campaign, Plastic Reduction. The initiative specifically targets and eliminates the retail use of single use take out plastic.  The Municipal Plastic Bottle Ban has been in effect in all 15 Cape Cod towns since 2021, the Commercial Single-use Plastic Water Bottle Ban and Plastic Reduction remain as ongoing campaigns.

References

External links 
 Northeastern University Faculty Link
 Sustainability and Climate Change Website

American economists
American environmentalists
American women economists
Northeastern University faculty
Economists from Massachusetts
21st-century American economists
Year of birth missing (living people)
Living people
21st-century American women